The 1913 VFL season was the 17th season of the Victorian Football League (VFL), the highest level senior Australian rules football competition in Victoria. The season featured ten clubs, ran from 26 April until 27 September, and comprised an 18-game home-and-away season followed by a finals series featuring the top four clubs.

The premiership was won by the Fitzroy Football Club for the fifth time, after it defeated  by 13 points in the 1913 VFL Grand Final.

Premiership season
In 1913, the VFL competition consisted of ten teams of 18 on-the-field players each, with no "reserves", although any of the 18 players who had left the playing field for any reason could later resume their place on the field at any time during the match.

Each team played each other twice in a home-and-away season of 18 rounds.

Once the 18 round home-and-away season had finished, the 1913 VFL Premiers were determined by the specific format and conventions of the amended "Argus system".

Round 1

|- bgcolor="#CCCCFF"
| Home team
| Home team score
| Away team
| Away team score
| Venue
| Date
|- bgcolor="#FFFFFF"
| 
| 7.13 (55)
| 
| 5.7 (37)
| Corio Oval
| 26 April 1913
|- bgcolor="#FFFFFF"
| 
| 10.19 (79)
| 
| 5.7 (37)
| Brunswick Street Oval
| 26 April 1913
|- bgcolor="#FFFFFF"
| 
| 8.15 (63)
| 
| 8.6 (54)
| Lake Oval
| 26 April 1913
|- bgcolor="#FFFFFF"
| 
| 5.7 (37)
| 
| 8.12 (60)
| MCG
| 26 April 1913
|- bgcolor="#FFFFFF"
| 
| 9.13 (67)
| 
| 11.17 (83)
| EMCG
| 26 April 1913

Round 2

|- bgcolor="#CCCCFF"
| Home team
| Home team score
| Away team
| Away team score
| Venue
| Date
|- bgcolor="#FFFFFF"
| 
| 10.17 (77)
| 
| 11.2 (68)
| Victoria Park
| 3 May 1913
|- bgcolor="#FFFFFF"
| 
| 8.13 (61)
| 
| 9.7 (61)
| Princes Park
| 3 May 1913
|- bgcolor="#FFFFFF"
| 
| 10.12 (72)
| 
| 14.15 (99)
| MCG
| 3 May 1913
|- bgcolor="#FFFFFF"
| 
| 10.7 (67)
| 
| 3.16 (34)
| Junction Oval
| 3 May 1913
|- bgcolor="#FFFFFF"
| 
| 11.12 (78)
| 
| 13.11 (89)
| Punt Road Oval
| 3 May 1913

Round 3

|- bgcolor="#CCCCFF"
| Home team
| Home team score
| Away team
| Away team score
| Venue
| Date
|- bgcolor="#FFFFFF"
| 
| 8.14 (62)
| 
| 6.7 (43)
| Brunswick Street Oval
| 10 May 1913
|- bgcolor="#FFFFFF"
| 
| 11.13 (79)
| 
| 7.11 (53)
| Princes Park
| 10 May 1913
|- bgcolor="#FFFFFF"
| 
| 9.11 (65)
| 
| 10.13 (73)
| MCG
| 10 May 1913
|- bgcolor="#FFFFFF"
| 
| 8.9 (57)
| 
| 9.2 (56)
| Lake Oval
| 10 May 1913
|- bgcolor="#FFFFFF"
| 
| 10.5 (65)
| 
| 10.10 (70)
| EMCG
| 10 May 1913

Round 4

|- bgcolor="#CCCCFF"
| Home team
| Home team score
| Away team
| Away team score
| Venue
| Date
|- bgcolor="#FFFFFF"
| 
| 9.14 (68)
| 
| 7.12 (54)
| Punt Road Oval
| 17 May 1913
|- bgcolor="#FFFFFF"
| 
| 14.14 (98)
| 
| 7.9 (51)
| Corio Oval
| 17 May 1913
|- bgcolor="#FFFFFF"
| 
| 7.14 (56)
| 
| 15.13 (103)
| EMCG
| 17 May 1913
|- bgcolor="#FFFFFF"
| 
| 4.7 (31)
| 
| 7.11 (53)
| MCG
| 17 May 1913
|- bgcolor="#FFFFFF"
| 
| 6.8 (44)
| 
| 5.8 (38)
| Victoria Park
| 17 May 1913

Round 5

|- bgcolor="#CCCCFF"
| Home team
| Home team score
| Away team
| Away team score
| Venue
| Date
|- bgcolor="#FFFFFF"
| 
| 7.15 (57)
| 
| 9.17 (71)
| Corio Oval
| 24 May 1913
|- bgcolor="#FFFFFF"
| 
| 9.16 (70)
| 
| 6.12 (48)
| Victoria Park
| 24 May 1913
|- bgcolor="#FFFFFF"
| 
| 8.13 (61)
| 
| 7.14 (56)
| Junction Oval
| 24 May 1913
|- bgcolor="#FFFFFF"
| 
| 7.9 (51)
| 
| 5.6 (36)
| Brunswick Street Oval
| 24 May 1913
|- bgcolor="#FFFFFF"
| 
| 8.8 (56)
| 
| 10.12 (72)
| MCG
| 24 May 1913

Round 6

|- bgcolor="#CCCCFF"
| Home team
| Home team score
| Away team
| Away team score
| Venue
| Date
|- bgcolor="#FFFFFF"
| 
| 6.7 (43)
| 
| 5.6 (36)
| Brunswick Street Oval
| 31 May 1913
|- bgcolor="#FFFFFF"
| 
| 3.5 (23)
| 
| 6.11 (47)
| EMCG
| 31 May 1913
|- bgcolor="#FFFFFF"
| 
| 4.13 (37)
| 
| 3.6 (24)
| Princes Park
| 31 May 1913
|- bgcolor="#FFFFFF"
| 
| 6.16 (52)
| 
| 4.4 (28)
| Lake Oval
| 31 May 1913
|- bgcolor="#FFFFFF"
| 
| 2.8 (20)
| 
| 7.12 (54)
| MCG
| 31 May 1913

Round 7

|- bgcolor="#CCCCFF"
| Home team
| Home team score
| Away team
| Away team score
| Venue
| Date
|- bgcolor="#FFFFFF"
| 
| 14.22 (106)
| 
| 6.5 (41)
| EMCG
| 7 June 1913
|- bgcolor="#FFFFFF"
| 
| 13.11 (89)
| 
| 7.12 (54)
| Victoria Park
| 7 June 1913
|- bgcolor="#FFFFFF"
| 
| 7.10 (52)
| 
| 12.12 (84)
| MCG
| 7 June 1913
|- bgcolor="#FFFFFF"
| 
| 7.8 (50)
| 
| 11.17 (83)
| Lake Oval
| 7 June 1913
|- bgcolor="#FFFFFF"
| 
| 8.13 (61)
| 
| 10.7 (67)
| Punt Road Oval
| 7 June 1913

Round 8

|- bgcolor="#CCCCFF"
| Home team
| Home team score
| Away team
| Away team score
| Venue
| Date
|- bgcolor="#FFFFFF"
| 
| 5.7 (37)
| 
| 6.11 (47)
| Victoria Park
| 9 June 1913
|- bgcolor="#FFFFFF"
| 
| 10.9 (69)
| 
| 13.12 (90)
| MCG
| 9 June 1913
|- bgcolor="#FFFFFF"
| 
| 7.10 (52)
| 
| 5.10 (40)
| Punt Road Oval
| 9 June 1913
|- bgcolor="#FFFFFF"
| 
| 9.11 (65)
| 
| 7.13 (55)
| Junction Oval
| 9 June 1913
|- bgcolor="#FFFFFF"
| 
| 7.12 (54)
| 
| 9.15 (69)
| Corio Oval
| 9 June 1913

Round 9

|- bgcolor="#CCCCFF"
| Home team
| Home team score
| Away team
| Away team score
| Venue
| Date
|- bgcolor="#FFFFFF"
| 
| 9.17 (71)
| 
| 3.12 (30)
| EMCG
| 14 June 1913
|- bgcolor="#FFFFFF"
| 
| 5.10 (40)
| 
| 12.11 (83)
| MCG
| 14 June 1913
|- bgcolor="#FFFFFF"
| 
| 11.12 (78)
| 
| 10.11 (71)
| Junction Oval
| 14 June 1913
|- bgcolor="#FFFFFF"
| 
| 10.15 (75)
| 
| 7.9 (51)
| Lake Oval
| 14 June 1913
|- bgcolor="#FFFFFF"
| 
| 14.15 (99)
| 
| 9.10 (64)
| Brunswick Street Oval
| 14 June 1913

Round 10

|- bgcolor="#CCCCFF"
| Home team
| Home team score
| Away team
| Away team score
| Venue
| Date
|- bgcolor="#FFFFFF"
| 
| 9.11 (65)
| 
| 13.14 (92)
| Junction Oval
| 21 June 1913
|- bgcolor="#FFFFFF"
| 
| 14.11 (95)
| 
| 6.11 (47)
| Victoria Park
| 21 June 1913
|- bgcolor="#FFFFFF"
| 
| 15.15 (105)
| 
| 11.12 (78)
| Princes Park
| 21 June 1913
|- bgcolor="#FFFFFF"
| 
| 12.9 (81)
| 
| 8.15 (63)
| Punt Road Oval
| 21 June 1913
|- bgcolor="#FFFFFF"
| 
| 5.5 (35)
| 
| 10.15 (75)
| MCG
| 21 June 1913

Round 11

|- bgcolor="#CCCCFF"
| Home team
| Home team score
| Away team
| Away team score
| Venue
| Date
|- bgcolor="#FFFFFF"
| 
| 7.20 (62)
| 
| 7.11 (53)
| MCG
| 28 June 1913
|- bgcolor="#FFFFFF"
| 
| 7.11 (53)
| 
| 5.9 (39)
| Brunswick Street Oval
| 28 June 1913
|- bgcolor="#FFFFFF"
| 
| 8.9 (57)
| 
| 10.7 (67)
| EMCG
| 28 June 1913
|- bgcolor="#FFFFFF"
| 
| 8.12 (60)
| 
| 11.5 (71)
| Corio Oval
| 28 June 1913
|- bgcolor="#FFFFFF"
| 
| 12.16 (88)
| 
| 5.11 (41)
| Lake Oval
| 28 June 1913

Round 12

|- bgcolor="#CCCCFF"
| Home team
| Home team score
| Away team
| Away team score
| Venue
| Date
|- bgcolor="#FFFFFF"
| 
| 18.20 (128)
| 
| 7.14 (56)
| Junction Oval
| 5 July 1913
|- bgcolor="#FFFFFF"
| 
| 3.17 (35)
| 
| 8.11 (59)
| Punt Road Oval
| 5 July 1913
|- bgcolor="#FFFFFF"
| 
| 10.12 (72)
| 
| 7.12 (54)
| Victoria Park
| 5 July 1913
|- bgcolor="#FFFFFF"
| 
| 11.12 (78)
| 
| 8.13 (61)
| Corio Oval
| 5 July 1913
|- bgcolor="#FFFFFF"
| 
| 10.7 (67)
| 
| 7.12 (54)
| MCG
| 5 July 1913

Round 13

|- bgcolor="#CCCCFF"
| Home team
| Home team score
| Away team
| Away team score
| Venue
| Date
|- bgcolor="#FFFFFF"
| 
| 12.14 (86)
| 
| 3.10 (28)
| Brunswick Street Oval
| 19 July 1913
|- bgcolor="#FFFFFF"
| 
| 6.18 (54)
| 
| 11.11 (77)
| Princes Park
| 19 July 1913
|- bgcolor="#FFFFFF"
| 
| 9.8 (62)
| 
| 5.6 (36)
| Junction Oval
| 19 July 1913
|- bgcolor="#FFFFFF"
| 
| 5.6 (36)
| 
| 17.18 (120)
| MCG
| 19 July 1913
|- bgcolor="#FFFFFF"
| 
| 5.12 (42)
| 
| 7.20 (62)
| Lake Oval
| 19 July 1913

Round 14

|- bgcolor="#CCCCFF"
| Home team
| Home team score
| Away team
| Away team score
| Venue
| Date
|- bgcolor="#FFFFFF"
| 
| 5.5 (35)
| 
| 9.17 (71)
| MCG
| 26 July 1913
|- bgcolor="#FFFFFF"
| 
| 4.12 (36)
| 
| 7.12 (54)
| EMCG
| 26 July 1913
|- bgcolor="#FFFFFF"
| 
| 9.22 (76)
| 
| 3.8 (26)
| Princes Park
| 26 July 1913
|- bgcolor="#FFFFFF"
| 
| 12.10 (82)
| 
| 9.12 (66)
| Lake Oval
| 26 July 1913
|- bgcolor="#FFFFFF"
| 
| 5.15 (45)
| 
| 10.9 (69)
| Punt Road Oval
| 26 July 1913

Round 15

|- bgcolor="#CCCCFF"
| Home team
| Home team score
| Away team
| Away team score
| Venue
| Date
|- bgcolor="#FFFFFF"
| 
| 2.7 (19)
| 
| 5.18 (48)
| MCG
| 2 August 1913
|- bgcolor="#FFFFFF"
| 
| 12.15 (87)
| 
| 10.10 (70)
| Victoria Park
| 2 August 1913
|- bgcolor="#FFFFFF"
| 
| 6.10 (46)
| 
| 11.13 (79)
| Punt Road Oval
| 2 August 1913
|- bgcolor="#FFFFFF"
| 
| 11.10 (76)
| 
| 8.5 (53)
| Corio Oval
| 2 August 1913
|- bgcolor="#FFFFFF"
| 
| 10.10 (70)
| 
| 11.3 (69)
| Junction Oval
| 2 August 1913

Round 16

|- bgcolor="#CCCCFF"
| Home team
| Home team score
| Away team
| Away team score
| Venue
| Date
|- bgcolor="#FFFFFF"
| 
| 4.23 (47)
| 
| 4.2 (26)
| Corio Oval
| 9 August 1913
|- bgcolor="#FFFFFF"
| 
| 8.11 (59)
| 
| 7.14 (56)
| Brunswick Street Oval
| 9 August 1913
|- bgcolor="#FFFFFF"
| 
| 9.9 (63)
| 
| 7.9 (51)
| Princes Park
| 9 August 1913
|- bgcolor="#FFFFFF"
| 
| 8.12 (60)
| 
| 9.8 (62)
| MCG
| 9 August 1913
|- bgcolor="#FFFFFF"
| 
| 12.10 (82)
| 
| 6.8 (44)
| Junction Oval
| 9 August 1913

Round 17

|- bgcolor="#CCCCFF"
| Home team
| Home team score
| Away team
| Away team score
| Venue
| Date
|- bgcolor="#FFFFFF"
| 
| 17.9 (111)
| 
| 8.13 (61)
| Lake Oval
| 23 August 1913
|- bgcolor="#FFFFFF"
| 
| 7.8 (50)
| 
| 9.8 (62)
| EMCG
| 23 August 1913
|- bgcolor="#FFFFFF"
| 
| 6.10 (46)
| 
| 9.15 (69)
| Princes Park
| 23 August 1913
|- bgcolor="#FFFFFF"
| 
| 9.10 (64)
| 
| 8.5 (53)
| Punt Road Oval
| 23 August 1913
|- bgcolor="#FFFFFF"
| 
| 9.10 (64)
| 
| 4.13 (37)
| Brunswick Street Oval
| 23 August 1913

Round 18

|- bgcolor="#CCCCFF"
| Home team
| Home team score
| Away team
| Away team score
| Venue
| Date
|- bgcolor="#FFFFFF"
| 
| 15.11 (101)
| 
| 8.11 (59)
| Punt Road Oval
| 30 August 1913
|- bgcolor="#FFFFFF"
| 
| 15.18 (108)
| 
| 5.10 (40)
| Corio Oval
| 30 August 1913
|- bgcolor="#FFFFFF"
| 
| 7.12 (54)
| 
| 8.8 (56)
| Victoria Park
| 30 August 1913
|- bgcolor="#FFFFFF"
| 
| 4.8 (32)
| 
| 7.13 (55)
| Princes Park
| 30 August 1913
|- bgcolor="#FFFFFF"
| 
| 6.6 (42)
| 
| 6.16 (52)
| MCG
| 30 August 1913

Ladder

Finals
All of the 1913 finals were played at the MCG, so the home team in the semi-finals and preliminary final was the higher ranked team from the ladder but in the grand final the home team was the team that won the preliminary final.

Semi-finals

|- bgcolor="#CCCCFF"
| Home team
| Score
| Away team
| Score
| Venue
| Date
|- bgcolor="#FFFFFF"
| St Kilda
| 12.12 (84)
| South Melbourne
| 6.15 (51)
| MCG
| 6 September
|- bgcolor="#FFFFFF"
| Fitzroy
| 11.14 (80)
| Collingwood
| 6.7 (43)
| MCG
| 13 September

Preliminary final

|- bgcolor="#CCCCFF"
| Home team
| Score
| Away team
| Score
| Venue
| Date
|- bgcolor="#FFFFFF"
| St Kilda
| 10.10 (70)
| Fitzroy
| 6.9 (45)
| MCG
| 20 September

Grand final

Fitzroy defeated St Kilda 7.14 (56) to 5.13 (43), in front of a crowd of 59,479 people. (For an explanation of scoring see Australian rules football).

Awards
 The 1913 VFL Premiership team was Fitzroy.
 The VFL's leading goalkicker was Roy Park of University with 53 goals.
 University took the "wooden spoon" in 1913.

Notable events
 The VFL formed an independent tribunal to hear charges against players.
 Prior to Melbourne's Round 4 match against Fitzroy, six of the club's players went on strike to protest the club committee's failure to support a player charged by police after striking a Carlton player in Round 3. After Melbourne President Dr. William C. McClelland entered the club rooms and personally informed the players they would be expelled from the club if they did not take the field, the players called off their strike.
 In the round 14 match against Fitzroy, controversy erupted after VFL Stewards incorrectly reported Essendon follower Bill Walker.
 University Football Club's full-forward Roy Park, who stood only 5"5" (165 cm), was selected as the Victorian Interstate team's full-forward, and kicked 53 of university's 115 goals for the season. Park was the second player to win the goalkicking when his team won the wooden spoon, after Charlie Baker of St Kilda in 1902, whose team also finished last without a win.

References

Sources
 Rogers, S. & Brown, A., Every Game Ever Played: VFL/AFL Results 1897–1997 (Sixth Edition), Viking Books, (Ringwood), 1998.

External links
 1913 Season - AFL Tables

Australian Football League seasons
VFL season